Litaneutria skinneri, commonly known as the Skinner's ground mantis, is a species of praying mantis found in the south-western United States (Arizona, New Mexico, and Texas). It is also found in western and central Montana.

References

Skinneri
Insects of the United States
Mantodea of North America
Fauna of the Southwestern United States
Insects described in 1907